Kandiyohi can refer to a location in the United States:

 Kandiyohi, Minnesota, a small city
 Kandiyohi County, Minnesota
 Kandiyohi Township, Kandiyohi County, Minnesota